Solenanthus reverchonii is a species of plant in the family Boraginaceae. It is endemic to Spain.  Its natural habitat is temperate shrubland. It is threatened by habitat loss.

References

reverchonii
Endemic flora of Spain
Endemic flora of the Iberian Peninsula
Critically endangered plants
Critically endangered biota of Europe
Taxonomy articles created by Polbot